Leslie Ragon Caldwell (born 1957) is an American attorney, who served as the Assistant Attorney General for the Criminal Division of the United States Department of Justice from 2014 to 2017. She has spent the majority of her professional career handling federal criminal cases, as both a prosecutor and as defense attorney.  Since September 2017, she has been a partner at the law firm of Latham & Watkins, resident in San Francisco and Silicon Valley, CA.

Caldwell served as an Assistant United States Attorney in the Eastern District of New York from 1987 to 1998, after which she was recruited by then US Attorney Robert Mueller to serve as Chief of the Criminal Division and Chief of the Securities Fraud Section of the United States Attorney's office for the Northern District of California; she served from 1999 to 2002.

Background

In 2002, Caldwell was selected to lead a team of investigators and prosecutors in the Department of Justice's Enron Task Force. In that role, she recruited a team of federal prosecutors and agents from around the country to investigate the collapse of the former Fortune No. 7 company.  Under Caldwell's leadership, more than 30 individuals were successfully prosecuted for their roles in fraud at Enron, as well as several corporations including Merrill Lynch and the Canadian Imperial Bank of Commerce.

She received a B. A. in Economics summa cum laude from Pennsylvania State University, and a J. D. from the George Washington University Law School.

She started her career in private practice in New York, then moved to the US Attorney's Office in Brooklyn, in the Eastern District of New York.  Proving to be a highlight of her time with the Eastern District was Caldwell's successful conviction of New York City drug lord Howard "Pappy" Mason for the murder of Officer Edward Bryne.

She then was recruited by then-San Francisco US Attorney Robert S. Mueller III to head his efforts against white collar crime in Silicon Valley.  After being named the Chief of that Office's Criminal Division, Caldwell was recruited by DOJ to head up the Enron Task Force, created to spearhead the investigation of that company's 2001 collapse.  Caldwell built a team of lawyers and FBI agents, and successfully investigated one of the largest corporate collapses in history.  She led 
the successful prosecutions of more than 30 former Enron executives and others, including Kenneth Lay and Jeffrey Skilling.

In the wake of the Enron convictions, Caldwell turned to private practice as a partner at Morgan, Lewis & Bockius where she worked until early 2014. On May 15, 2014 Leslie R. Caldwell was confirmed as the United States Assistant Attorney General for the Criminal Division.

References

External links

1957 births
American women lawyers
George Washington University Law School alumni
Living people
Obama administration personnel
Pennsylvania State University alumni
United States Assistant Attorneys General for the Criminal Division
21st-century American women
Assistant United States Attorneys